Midhopestones is a village which forms part of the parish of Bradfield, in the City of Sheffield, South Yorkshire, England; here defined as the part of the parish in the Stocksbridge and Upper Don ward and the S36 postcode area.  The area contains 23 listed buildings that are recorded in the National Heritage List for England.  Of these, one is listed at Grade II*, the middle of the three grades, and the others are at Grade II, the lowest grade.  The area is to the northwest of the city of Sheffield, and contains the village of Midhopestones, the hamlets of Upper Midhope and Wigtwizzle, and a large area of countryside, much of which is moorland.

The listed buildings consist of farmhouses and associated buildings, houses, a toll cottage, an inn, a smithy, a bridge, and a guide post.


Key

Buildings

References

Citations

Sources

 

Lists of listed buildings in South Yorkshire
Buildings and structures in Sheffield